Indoor cycling (Artistic cycling and Cycle ball) and BMX freestyle (as part of the extreme sports) at the 2007 Asian Indoor Games was held in Luso-Chinese School Pavilion and MUST Pavilion, Macau, China from 26 October to 2 November 2007.

Medalists

BMX freestyle

Indoor

Medal table

Results

BMX freestyle

Big air
27 October

Flatland
1–2 November

Park
26–28 October

Park best trick
28 October

Vert
30 October – 2 November

Indoor

Men's singles
27 October

Men's pair
27 October

Women's singles
27 October

Women's pair
27 October

Cycle ball

Preliminary
26 October

Knockout round

References
 2007 Asian Indoor Games official website
 Japan Federation of Indoor Cycling

2007 Asian Indoor Games events
Asian Indoor Games
2007